A School for Greybeards is a 1786 comedy play by the British writer Hannah Cowley.

The original cast included Thomas King as Don Alexis, John Philip Kemble as Don Henry, William Parsons as Don Gasper, John Bannister as Don Sebastian, John Palmer as Don Octavio, Mary Ann Wrighten as Rachel, Ann Maria Crouch as Donna Maria and Elizabeth Farren as Donna Seraphina.

References

Bibliography
 Nicoll, Allardyce. A History of English Drama 1660–1900: Volume III. Cambridge University Press, 2009.
 Hogan, C.B (ed.) The London Stage, 1660–1800: Volume V. Southern Illinois University Press, 1968.

1786 plays
Comedy plays
West End plays
Plays by Hannah Cowley